Bezirgan Dam is a dam in Kastamonu Province, Turkey. It was built between 1995 and 2002.

See also
List of dams and reservoirs in Turkey

References
DSI

Dams in Kastamonu Province
Dams completed in 2002
2002 establishments in Turkey